Ephraim Rubenstein (born 1956 Brooklyn, NY) is a noted American representational painter and teacher.

Early life and training
Rubenstein was born to Seth Rubenstein, a Brooklyn-based trusts and estates lawyer. His grandfather, E. Ivan Rubenstein, was a judge on the Brooklyn Supreme Court.

Rubenstein began studying art privately in the painting group of David Levine and Aaron Shikler, as well as in the studio of Andrew Reiss. In 1977–78 he won a Brooklyn Arts and Cultural Association (BACA) high school scholarship to the Brooklyn Museum Art School, where he studied with Francis Cunningham. He graduated from Columbia University with a BA in Art History, in 1978, and from Columbia University School of the Arts with a MF.A. in Painting, in 1986. From 1987 to 1998, he taught at University of Richmond, the Rhode Island School of Design and the Maryland Institute College of Art. He subsequently studied at the Art Students League of New York with Robert Beverly Hale and Francis Cunningham, and at the National Academy of Design school with Harvey Dinnerstein.

From 1986 to 1997, he showed at Tibor de Nagy Gallery, where he had seven solo exhibitions. He exhibited subsequently at Tatistcheff & Co and George Billis Gallery in Chelsea. He has exhibited internationally, with numerous works exhibited as part of the US State Department's Art in Embassies Program. Rubenstein is a frequent contributor to American Artist, American Artist Drawing and The Artist's Magazine.

Rubenstein has been an influential teacher. From 1987 to 1998, he taught at University of Richmond, then at the Rhode Island School of Design, the Maryland Institute College of Art, and the National Academy of Design School.

He teaches at the Art Students League of New York, and Columbia University, Department of Narrative Medicine.

He is represented by Maurine Littleton Gallery.

Books 
"Ephraim Rubenstein: Painting from Observation," in Art Students League of New York on painting: lessons and meditations on mediums, styles, and methods. Watson Guptill Publications. 2015. ISBN 9780385345439.

Collections
His painting, Self-portrait with Books, is in The Metropolitan Museum of Art.

References

External links
https://ephraimrubenstein.com/
http://www.asllinea.org/ephraim-rubenstein-american-arts-quarterly/
http://www.thequickeningimage.com/Site_4/EPHRAIM.html
https://www.theartleague.org/school/faculty_desc.php?teacher_id=2801

1956 births
People from Brooklyn
Realist artists
Living people
Columbia University School of the Arts alumni
Art Students League of New York faculty
Maryland Institute College of Art faculty
Rhode Island School of Design faculty
National Academy of Design faculty
Columbia University faculty
Columbia College (New York) alumni